Frances Bardsley Academy for Girls is a non-denominational girls school and sixth form centre in the London Borough of Havering, England. The school educates girls between the ages of 11 and 18 (school years 7 to 13).

Overview 
The school is located on Brentwood Road, Romford. In 2011 the school had 1308 pupils on its roll. The majority of pupils have white UK backgrounds though there has been a steady increase in girls from other ethnic and cultural backgrounds including African-Caribbean and those from the Indian subcontinent.

The student body represents girls from many different council estates. Just over 7% of pupils claim free school meals which is below the national average.
Until 2003 the school was based on two separate sites; the Upper School (school years 9–13) at the existing site in Brentwood Road (built in 1910) and the Lower School (school years 7 and 8) at a separate site in Heath Park Road (built in 1906 and recognised by the Essex Education authority in 1909 when a commemorative stone was placed in the wall at the front of the school). These two sites were around a quarter of a mile from one another, and joined by a long road which is Catherine Road at the Lower School end and Lawrence Road at the Upper School end. Girls from the Upper School often attended lessons on the Lower School site. GCSE and AS/A Level Art and Design were two of the subjects which girls frequently had to travel between the two sites for. It was considered that this was a less than desirable situation.

It was this less than desirable situation which meant that in 2003 the Lower School Site was sold and developed into houses and flats. The main school building was converted into 12 apartments and 2 duplex galleried houses and renamed ‘Academy Square’. As it is a grade II Listed Building it could not be knocked down. This project was not completed entirely until 2006 and went on to win the Built-In Quality Award from the London District Surveyors Association. This part of the work was done by Cove Architects who specialise in "Built-In" architecture (i.e. when a building which already exists is converted into something else).

The other buildings, including the gym, "B-Block" (a prefabricated building dating from the late 1980s) and "wing" (a supposedly temporary structure dating from the 1940s and consisting of a science laboratory and three classrooms) were demolished, and houses built on them. This estate is now known as ‘Academy Fields’.

Motto
The schools motto is "Gladly Lerne, Gladly Teche" and comes from the quotation "And gladly wolde he lerne, and gladly teche."
from Prologue, Line 310 of The Canterbury Tales by Geoffrey Chaucer.

History
Previous to the school becoming The Frances Bardsley School for Girls in 1972, the two sites had housed "sister" schools; a Secondary modern school and a Grammar school.

The first school was started, in 1906, by the founder Frances Bardsley in the centre of Romford; her vision was to provide free education for local girls. So established did the school become that it moved into large new premises on the northern outskirts of Romford (the modern day site on Brentwood Road). In the 1930s, as a result of educational policy the school became a selective Grammar school, and was renamed the Romford County High School for Girls.

At this time the old Lower School site on Heath Park Road (now Academy Fields) was the Secondary Modern school known as The Heath Park Secondary Modern School for Girls.

After the reforming implementation of Comprehensive schools during the 1970s The Romford County High School for Girls and The Heath Park Secondary Modern School for Girls amalgamated to become what we now know as The Frances Bardsley School for Girls, and the Lower School/Upper School dynamic that was in place until 2003, was established.

The school gained Specialist school status in the Visual arts in July 2004, and then converted to academy status on 1 July 2012.

Head Teachers
The current headmaster (from September 2011) is Julian Dutnall. The previous headteacher was Suzanne Philipps. She held the post from 2001 to 2011. Previous to her taking over the role the Headmistress was Pamela Joughin. The headmistress during the 1980s was Mrs Irwin-Hunt. Miss Mullholland was the headmistress from 1969 after  Miss Dorothy Bubbers retired.

Houses
The school has 8 houses, named after trees. These are:

Fagus (Beech) (commonly referred to as ‘F’ which stands for ‘Fagus’ the Latin word for Beech)
Birch (commonly referred to as ‘B’)
Elm (commonly referred to as ‘E’)
Larch (commonly referred to as ‘L’)
Oak (commonly referred to as ‘O’)
Rowan (commonly referred to as ‘R’)
Sycamore (commonly referred to as ‘S’)
Willow (commonly referred to as ‘W’)

There are a variety of sporting and creative house activities planned throughout the year. A House cup is presented at Sports Day and House points are awarded for all activities. There is one House event planned in school diary for each half term. The student leadership team which consists of year 12/13 students are Heads of each House. 
In 1995, Heenal Raichura, at the age of just nine years old, joined Frances Bardsley School for Girls. She was the youngest person in UK to join a secondary school.
In 1998 Head of Physical Education, Melanie Cambridge, appeared on the now decommissioned LWT show Don't Try This at Home. The programme was based on a series of daredevil stunts, and Melanie had to jump out of a plane. This was most noteworthy to pupils at the time, because Essex-boy Darren Day brought his camera crew into the Lower School to "challenge" Melanie.
In 1999 the school choir, at the time led by Christine Petherick, sang on the London Heart 106.2 FM especially commissioned version of ‘I Have a Dream’ with Irish boyband, Westlife. They won this privilege after sending the radio station in a tape of them singing the song.
The actress currently playing Louisa in The Sound of Music revival at London Palladium attends the school. Her name is Sophie Onslow
Current teacher (& Deputy Head) at the school, Karen Tann, was awarded a Royal Institute of ChemistryTeacher Fellowship in 2005.
Former teacher Kate Spiller had her obituary published in The Guardian when she died in 2006.

Absence rates
The school has a 7% authorised absence rate and 0.5%  unauthorised absence rate. This compares favorably to the 7% national authorised absence rate and 1.2% unauthorised absence rate in the UK.

GCSE results
The last published available information is from 2004, when 73% of pupils in Year 11 achieved 5 or more A*-C GCSEs. This was up on the previous year when 70% of pupils in Year 11 achieved 5 or more A*-C GCSEs.

Ofsted results
The last Ofsted (Office for Standards in Education) inspection took place on 13–14 October 2011 (inspection number 376704). Liz Duffy led the investigation, assisted by a team of five other inspectors.

The full report, as well as previous reports, can be read on Office for Standards in Education website.

Relationship with parents
From as far back as the school has existed the school has maintained strong links with parents and pupils. The school regularly issues newsletters. As of 2013, the academy has issued information to parents through ParentMail.

Heads of department
Art: J Appleby
Business: B O'Neill
English Literature and Language: S Dowie
Drama and Theatre: H Mond
Geography: L Hebden
History: G Hall
Information Technology: W Guchu
Mathematics:  D Gaya
MFL and French: A Lakhan 
Music: A Johnson
Media:  C Venis 
Photography: L Chapman
Physical Education: M Cambridge
Health and Social Education: - M Jackson (Acting Head)
Religious Studies: G McGrath
Science: D Kiff
Sixth Form: A Crosby, M Jackson, W Menlove
Technology: T Haylock

Notable former pupils
Edna Mann, painter and co-founder of the Borough Group of artists.
Heenal Raichura, BSc MB BS FRCP, who became UK's youngest medical student at the age of 16 in 2002 studied at Frances Bardsley School from 1995 to 2000.
Paula Jennings from New Tricks and EastEnders attended the school until 1992.
Natalie Steward, winner of the Bronze medal for 100m freestyle at the 1960 Olympics, attended the school in the 1950s.
Gemma Collins, media personality and businesswoman, attended the school from 1992 to 1996.
Rochelle Wiseman from The Saturdays.

See also
Frances Bardsley International

References

External links

The Friends of Frances Bardsley

Girls' schools in London
Educational institutions established in 1906
Secondary schools in the London Borough of Havering
Academies in the London Borough of Havering
1906 establishments in England
Romford